Bill Sheahan may refer to:

 Bill Sheahan (umpire) (born 1953), Australian Test cricket match umpire
 Bill Sheahan (politician) (1895–1975), Australian politician